Iordăcheanu is a commune in Prahova County, Muntenia, Romania. It is composed of six villages: Iordăcheanu, Mocești, Plavia, Străoști, Valea Cucului and Vărbila.

A statue in honor of Michael the Brave's trek through Iordăcheanu is located in this commune. The name Iordăcheanu comes from a local man named "Iordache" . The little river Cricovul Sărat flows through the commune.

Vărbila Monastery, built in the 16th century, is located in Vărbila village.

References

Communes in Prahova County
Localities in Muntenia